Keravnos B.C. (Greek: Γυμναστικός Σύλλογος Στροβόλου «Ο Κεραυνός»), also known as Keravnos Strovolou, is a professional basketball club based in Strovolos, Nicosia, Cyprus. It plays its home games in the Costas Papaellinas Arena, which has a capacity of 2,000 spectators. 

The club’s president since 1996 is businessman Paris C. Papaellinas, who has also been the main sponsor of the club for the last 20 years.

History

The men's basketball department of Keravnos was established in 1964. The club was one of the founding members of the Cyprus Basketball Federation in 1966 and won its first national league in 1989.

Keravnos competed for 18 consecutive years in European competitions from 1995 to 2013. The first time Keravnos B.C. took part in European competitions was in 1982, when the team played against KK Zadar. In the 1997–98 season, just after winning their second league, the team reached the second round of a European Cup for the first time. In the Second Round, Keravnos achieved one of their greatest victories in the history of Cypriot Basketball after defeating Žalgiris Kaunas 61–57 in Nicosia. In the second leg, they lost at Kaunas and were eliminated from the competition. Žalgiris progressed to win the European Cup that year (1998) as well as the European Championship the following year (1999), known as Euroleague.

The year 2001 was a great one for Keravnos. The team won the Championship for a second consecutive time and also recorded the greatest success that had ever been achieved by any Cypriot sports team, in Pan-European competitions by qualifying for the quarter-finals of the European Saporta Cup. They defeated the Bosnian team KK Borac Banja Luka, before they were eliminated by Pamesa Valencia. During this campaign, the team had unbelievable success defeating Red star of Belgrade and Paris Basket of Tony Parker among others.

In 2004, the team qualified to the Final Four of South Conference of FIBA Europe Cup Challenge, where the team finished fourth in the competition. They qualified to the final four again the following year (2005) and this time they finished in the third position. In 2007, Keravnos again recorded a new success story. The team qualified for the final of the EuroCup Challenge after beating in the semi-finals Dnipro twice in the semi-finals. Keravnos was the only Cypriot club from any sport ever to reach a major European Final. In the EuroCup Challenge Final, Keravnos faced the Russian Club from Samara, defeating them by 85–83 at home but the score was not enough to give the team the trophy after losing in Samara 101–81 away.

After this success, Keravnos achieved three more national titles, in 2008, 2017 and 2019.

After winning the Cypriot title in 2019, Keravnos played in the qualifying rounds of the Basketball Champions League. The club qualified for the BCL for the first time in club history after beating Iraklis and Donar. As such, it became the first Cypriot club ever to qualify for the competition.

Players

Current roster

Notable players

  Guy Pnini
  Kenny Barker
  Lance Blanks
  Cedric Henderson
  Mike King

Honours

Men's

Domestic
Cyprus Basketball Division A
Winner (8): 1988–89, 1996–97, 1999–2000, 2000–01, 2007–08, 2016–17, 2018–19, 2021–22
Runner-up (11): 1981–82, 1982–83, 1983–84, 1995–96, 1997–98, 2001–02, 2002–03, 2003–04, 2008–09, 2011–12, 2017–18
Cyprus Men's Basketball Cup:
Winner: (11) 1988–89, 1996–97, 1997–98, 1998–99, 2004–05, 2005–06, 2006–07, 2009–10, 2011–12, 2018–19, 2021–22
Runner-up: (3) 1986–87, 1987–88, 2012–13
Cyprus Men's Basketball Supercup:
Winner (5): 1998, 1999, 2012, 2020, 2021
Cypriot Second Division
Winners (2): 1978–79, 1987–88

European
FIBA EuroCup Challenge
Runner-up (1): 2006–07

Basketball academies
Since 1987, the club is focused nearly 100% in basketball and Keravnos Basketball Academies are considered as being the most dynamic and the most professional all over the island. Currently, the Basketball Academy has over 300 members and overall with Tennis and Football reach over 750 members. Head of the Academy is Mr. Nicos Lambrias.

References

External links
 Official homepage 
 Eurobasket.com Keravnos BC Page
 Team presentation at Basketball Champions League website
 Team presentation at FIBA Europe Cup website

Basketball teams in Cyprus
Basketball teams established in 1964
Sport in Nicosia
1926 establishments in Cyprus
Keravnos Strovolou